Tasmanian of the Year Awards is an award given to the most outstanding Tasmanian in any given year. The Awards are made by the Tasmania Committee Incorporated and is organised and funded with government support. It was first awarded in 1985.

The following is a list of recipients of the Tasmanian of the Year award:

The Tasmanian of the Year award doesn't appear to have been awarded since 2008, and the Tasmanian Committee Inc., website is no longer active. Later references to the "Tasmanian of the Year" may refer to the Tasmanian Australian of the Year award.

Tasmanian Australian of the Year

This is the Tasmanian finalist for Australian of the Year, also known as the TAS State Recipient Australian of the Year.

References

Lists of Australian award winners
Tasmanian
People from Tasmania
Tasmania-related lists